
Gmina Borne Sulinowo is an urban-rural gmina (administrative district) in Szczecinek County, West Pomeranian Voivodeship, in north-western Poland.

The gmina contains part of the protected area called Drawsko Landscape Park.

Villages
Apart from the town of Borne Sulinowo, Gmina Borne Sulinowo contains the villages and settlements of Ciemino, Ciemino Małe, Czochryń, Dąbie, Dąbrowica, Grabno, Grzywnik, Jeleń, Jelonek, Jeziorna, Juchowo, Kądzielnia, Kiełpino, Kłomino, Kłosówko, Kolanowo, Komorze, Krągi, Kucharowo, Łączno, Liszkowo, Łubowo, Międzylesie, Nobliny, Obrąb, Okole, Osiczyn, Piława, Przyjezierze, Radacz, Rakowo, Silnowo, Śmiadowo, Starowice, Strzeszyn, Uniemino and Zamęcie.

Neighbouring gminas
Gmina Borne Sulinowo is bordered by the gminas of Barwice, Czaplinek, Grzmiąca, Jastrowie, Okonek and Szczecinek.

References
Polish official population figures 2006

Borne Sulinowo
Szczecinek County